In topology, a branch of mathematics, the suspension of a topological space X is intuitively obtained by stretching X into a cylinder and then collapsing both end faces to points. One views X as "suspended" between these end points. The suspension of X is denoted by SX or susp(X). 

There is a variation of the suspension for pointed space, which is called the reduced suspension and denoted by ΣX. The "usual" suspension SX is sometimes called the unreduced suspension, unbased suspension, or free suspension of X, to distinguish it from ΣX.

Free suspension 
The (free) suspension  of a topological space  can be defined in several ways.

1.  is the quotient space . In other words, it can be constructed as follows:

 Construct the cylinder .
 Consider the entire set  as a single point ("glue" all its points together).
 Consider the entire set  as a single point ("glue" all its points together).

2. Another way to write this is:

Where  are two points, and for each i in {0,1},   is the projection to the point  (a function that maps everything to ).

3. One can view  as two cones on X, glued together at their base.

4.  can also be defined as the join  where  is a discrete space with two points.

Properties 
In rough terms, S increases the dimension of a space by one: for example, it takes an n-sphere to an (n + 1)-sphere for n ≥ 0.

Given a continuous map   there is a continuous map  defined by  where square brackets denote equivalence classes. This makes  into a functor from the category of topological spaces to itself.

Reduced suspension
If X is a pointed space with basepoint x0, there is a variation of the suspension which is sometimes more useful. The reduced suspension or based suspension ΣX of X is the quotient space:

.

This is the equivalent to taking SX and collapsing the line (x0 × I) joining the two ends to a single point. The basepoint of the pointed space ΣX is taken to be the equivalence class of (x0, 0).

One can show that the reduced suspension of X is homeomorphic to the smash product of X with the unit circle S1.

For well-behaved spaces, such as CW complexes, the reduced suspension of X is homotopy equivalent to the unbased suspension.

Adjunction of reduced suspension and loop space functors 
Σ gives rise to a functor from the category of pointed spaces to itself. An important property of this functor is that it is left adjoint to the functor  taking a pointed space  to its loop space . In other words, we have a natural isomorphism

(The continuity of all involved maps needs to be checked.)  

The adjunction is thus akin to currying, taking maps on cartesian products to their curried form, and is an example of Eckmann–Hilton duality. 

This adjunction is a special case of the adjunction explained in the article on smash products.

Applications 
The reduced suspension can be used to construct a homomorphism of homotopy groups, to which the Freudenthal suspension theorem applies. In homotopy theory, the phenomena which are preserved under suspension, in a suitable sense, make up stable homotopy theory.

Examples 
Some examples of suspensions are:

 The suspension of an n-ball is homeomorphic to the (n+1)-ball.

Desuspension

Desuspension is an operation partially inverse to suspension.

See also
Double suspension theorem
Cone (topology)
Join (topology)

References

Topology
Homotopy theory